"Why They Call It Falling" is a song written by Don Schlitz and Roxie Dean, and recorded by American country music artist Lee Ann Womack. It was released in April 2001 as the third single from her third studio album, I Hope You Dance; it peaked at number 13 on the Billboard Hot Country Singles & Tracks.

Critical reception
Editors at Billboard called the song "A stunning ballad that showcases the chanteuse's heart-in-throat vocals." They also said, "It's a savvy lyric, and Womack's tender, vulnerable delivery perfectly complements the song. Add to that Mark Wright's production, which keeps everything swirling and swelling around her vocals, and it's a small sonic masterpiece. Womack continues to distinguish herself as the most compelling young female vocalist in country music."

Live performances
Womack performed "Why They Call It Falling" on The Tonight Show with Jay Leno.

Chart performance
"Why They Call It Falling" debuted at number 58 on the U.S. Billboard Hot Country Singles & Tracks for the week of April 7, 2001.

Year-end charts

References

2001 singles
2000 songs
Lee Ann Womack songs
Songs written by Don Schlitz
Songs written by Roxie Dean
MCA Nashville Records singles
Song recordings produced by Mark Wright (record producer)